The Canadair Sabre is a jet fighter aircraft built by Canadair under licence from North American Aviation. A variant of the North American F-86 Sabre, it was produced until 1958 and used primarily by the Royal Canadian Air Force (RCAF) until replaced with the Canadair CF-104 in 1962. Several other air forces also operated the aircraft.

The aircraft was produced in two significant batches. The first, the Mk. 2 and Mk. 4s, with fewer than 1,000 produced, were only slightly different from their US counterparts. The second run, the Mk. 5s and Mk. 6s of similar numbers, were patterned on the later versions of the US Sabre with larger wings for improved maneuverability while replacing the original General Electric J47 engine with the locally designed more-powerful Avro Canada Orenda.

The last of the Canadair Sabres in front-line operation were in Pakistan, whose AIM-9 Sidewinder-equipped Mk. 6 models were the backbone of their air force during the Indo-Pakistani War of 1971. These racked up an impressive victory ratio over their Indian counterparts, which lacked missiles. These were slowly phased out after 1971, with the last examples leaving combat service in 1980. Although replaced by higher-performance designs in most other forces by the 1960s, late-model versions served in secondary roles into the 1970s.

Some Orenda-powered examples became famous for other feats. Most notable was the single Mk. 3, the test-bed for the Orenda fit, which Jacqueline Cochran used in 1953 to set several speed records, including becoming the first woman to break the sound barrier. Another, an ex-RCAF Mk. 6 that left service in 1974, went on to become Boeing's chase plane for test flights until 1991. Many of these later aircraft are now preserved in museums.

Design and development

In 1948, the Canadian government decided to re-equip the RCAF with the F-86 Sabre with Canadair contracted to produce them in Montreal, Quebec, Canada. An initial batch of 10 aircraft was ordered for tool verification. The Korean War changed this to a production batch of 100 aircraft. Canadair slowly built up its production facility to make all components with related equipment obtained from other Canadian suppliers. Canadair gave the Sabre the project number CL-13.

Canadair produced six versions of the CL-13 Sabre. The sole Sabre Mk.1 was essentially the same as the North American Sabre F-86A. It had a General Electric J47-GE-13 turbojet of  thrust. The Sabre Mk.2 had the same engine, although after the first 20 aircraft were produced, the remainder of the production run was distinguished in having power-assisted controls and an "all-flying" tailplane. The sole Sabre Mk.3 was the first of the Canadian Sabres to use the Avro Canada Orenda turbojet (Orenda 3 with  thrust). The Sabre Mk.4 retained the General Electric engine, was destined for the RAF and was later passed on to other overseas air forces. The Sabre Mk.5 was the next production version, equipped with an Orenda 10 with  thrust. A change to the Orenda 14 with  powered the Sabre Mk.6.

The last Sabre to be manufactured by Canadair (Sabre No. 1815), after being donated by the Pakistan Air Force, is now part of the permanent collection in the Western Canada Aviation Museum (WCAM) in Winnipeg, Manitoba. From 1950 to 1958, a total of 1,815 CL-13 Sabres were built at the Canadair plant in Montreal.

Operational history

The second generation of Canadair Sabre aircraft, and first to be built in quantity, was the Mk.2, with 350 produced from 1952 to 1953. The RCAF received 290 of these improved aircraft. During the first half of 1952, the remaining 60 Mk.2s were supplied to the U.S. Air Force for use in the Korean War. Most RCAF Mk.2 Sabres were utilized in the air defence role with NATO's No. 1 Air Division in Europe, proving itself to be an outstanding dogfighter. Others were assigned to the training role at bases in Canada. After replacement by the Sabre 5 in RCAF service from 1954, just over 210 surviving Sabre 2s were overhauled and modified in the UK and supplied in roughly equal numbers to the Greek Air Force and Turkish Air Forces.

In mid-1952, the Sabre Mk.4 went into production with the first one flown on 28 August 1952. Apart from some minor structural and systems changes, including improved air-conditioning and gun sight, the Mk 2 and the Mk 4 were identical. Of 438 Mk 4s built, approximately 70 were used temporarily by the RCAF, all surviving examples being passed to the RAF. The other Sabre 4s went directly to the RAF under a mutual aid program, equipping 11 RAF squadrons. The majority served in West Germany with NATO, with two squadrons being based in the UK as part of RAF Fighter Command. The Sabre Mk.4 served with the RAF until mid-1956 when they were replaced by Hawker Hunters. The survivors were overhauled in the UK, fitted with '6-3' wing modifications and handed to the USAF (which had funded these aircraft) which in turn passed them on to other NATO members, with the majority going to Italy and Yugoslavia.

On 30 July 1953, the first Sabre Mk.5 flew with the Orenda 10 engine, which gave it a clear rate of climb and ceiling advantage over earlier variants. Other Mk 5 improvements included a new oxygen system and improved maneuverability and low-speed characteristics achieved by increasing the wing chord by six in (15.2 cm) at the root and three in. (7.2 cm) at the wing tip along with fitting a small vertical wing fence. This modification, originated by North American on the F-86F, dramatically improved maneuverability, though the loss of the slatted leading edge increased landing speed and degraded low speed handling considerably. Canadair built 370 Mk 5s with the majority designated for use in the RCAF's Air Division squadrons in Europe to replace the Mk.2s. A total of 75 RCAF Sabre 5s were transferred to the German Luftwaffe during 1957.

The Canadair Sabre Mk.6 was the final variant and was considered to be the "best" production Sabre ever built. It was equipped with a two-stage Orenda engine developing .) of static thrust. Its altitude performance and climb rate was enhanced over the Mk 5 and the reinstatement of the wing leading edge slat gave it excellent low-speed characteristics. The first production model was completed on 2 November 1954 and ultimately 655 were built with production terminating on 9 October 1958.

A total of 390 Mk.6s went to the RCAF with the majority replacing the existing Canadair Sabre Mk.5s at the Air Division squadrons in West Germany and France. The main air threats to NATO in the 1950s in Central Europe were the early variants of the Soviet MiG- the MiG-15, MiG-17, MiG-19 and MiG-21. Based on the Korean War experience, the selection of the Mk.6 Sabre to provide an effective opposition to the MiG threat proved to be a logical one. Canada's commitment to NATO was to provide 12 squadrons located at four bases – two in France (Marville and Grostenquin) and two in West Germany (Zweibrücken and Baden Soellingen). Initially, the contribution consisted of only Sabre aircraft; however, later it was decided to include the Avro Canada CF-100 aircraft in the defense package to provide a night and all-weather fighter capability.

Though the main use of the Sabre by the RCAF was in Europe, they were also used by RCAF Auxiliary part-time units in Canada, replacing de Havilland Vampire jets.  400 "City Of Toronto" and 411 "County Of York" Squadrons based at RCAF Station Downsview near Toronto, as well as 401 "City Of Westmount" and 438 "City Of Montreal" Squadrons at RCAF Station St-Hubert near Montreal, were equipped with Sabre 5s, as was 442 "City Of Vancouver" Squadron at RCAF Station Sea Island, near Vancouver.

In addition to the RCAF deliveries, 225 Canadair Mk.6 Sabres were exported to the West German Luftwaffe, six were delivered to the Colombian Air Force, and 34 went to the South African Air Force.

In January 1966, Germany sold 90 of its Canadian Mk 6 Sabres to Iran. These aircraft were quickly transferred to Pakistan and became the main day fighter of the Pakistan Air Force.

Canadair Sabres were the mainstay of their respective air forces in the two major conflicts in which they were employed: the Korean War, where F-86 Sabres racked up an impressive 6-1 kill record, and the Indo-Pakistani War of 1971. The diminutive Folland Gnat was its main opponent in the Indo-Pakistan war. By the end of 1971, the Gnat proved to be a frustrating opponent for the larger, heavier and older Sabre. The Gnat was referred to as a "Sabre Slayer" by the Indian Air Force since most of its combat kills during the two wars were against Sabres. Although the Canadair Sabre Mk.6 was widely regarded as the best dogfighter of its era, tactics called for Gnats taking on the Sabres in the vertical arena, where the Sabres were at a disadvantage. Moreover, because the Gnat was lightweight and compact in shape, it was hard to see, especially at the low levels where most of the dogfights took place.

Women's speed records

In 1952, Jacqueline Cochran, then aged 47, decided to challenge the world speed record for women, then held by Jacqueline Auriol. She tried to borrow an F-86 from the U.S. Air Force, but was refused. She was introduced to an Air Vice-Marshal of the RCAF who, with the permission of the Canadian Minister of Defence, arranged for her to borrow 19200, the sole Sabre 3. Canadair sent a 16-man support team to California for the attempt. On 18 May 1953, Ms. While she was in California, she exceeded 1270 km/h in a dive, and thus became the first woman to exceed the speed of sound.

Golden Hawks

The Golden Hawks were a Canadian aerobatic flying team that was established in 1959 to celebrate the Royal Canadian Air Force's 35th anniversary and the "Golden" 50th anniversary of Canadian flight, which began with the AEA Silver Dart in 1909. Initially, a six-plane team flying brilliantly painted metallic-gold Canadair Sabre Mk.5s, was envisioned as performing for only one year, but the Golden Hawks were so popular after their single 63-show season that the team was expanded. In the following year, another plane was added to the team, allowing for a five-plane main formation with two solo jets. The Golden Hawks continued performing for three more seasons, changing to the Mk 6 in 1961, until they were disbanded on 7 February 1964, having flown a total of 317 shows across North America.

Variants

Sabre Mk.1
One built, prototype F-86A.
Sabre Mk.2
350 built, F-86E-type, 60 to USAF, three to RAF, 287 to RCAF.
Sabre Mk.3
One built in Canada, test-bed for the Orenda 3 jet engine, various other structural modifications were made to accommodate the Orenda engine.
Sabre Mk.4
438 built, production: ten to RCAF, 428 to RAF as Sabre F 4.
Sabre Mk.5
370 built, F-86F-type with Orenda engine, all to RCAF, 75 later passed to German Air Force.
Sabre Mk.6
655 built, 390 to RCAF, 225 to Luftwaffe, six to Colombia and 34 to South Africa.

Operators

 Royal Canadian Air Force
 No. 400 Squadron RCAF 
 No. 401 Squadron RCAF
 No. 410 Squadron RCAF 
 No. 411 Squadron RCAF 
 No. 413 Squadron RCAF
 No. 414 Squadron RCAF
 No. 416 Squadron RCAF
 No. 421 Squadron RCAF
 No. 422 Squadron RCAF
 No. 427 Squadron RCAF
 No. 430 Squadron RCAF
 No. 434 Squadron RCAF
 No. 438 Squadron RCAF 
 No. 439 Squadron RCAF
 No. 441 Squadron RCAF
 No. 442 Squadron RCAF 
 No. 444 Squadron RCAF

 Colombian Air Force

 German Air Force - operated 75 Canadair Sabre Mk 5 and 225 Canadair Sabre Mk 6, 1957–1964, flown by JG 71, JG 72, and JG 73. The last Mk 6 used for training was retired in 1983. 

 Royal Hellenic Air Force 120 used Canadair CL-13 Mk.4 acquired from Royal Canadian Air Force and redesignated as F-86E(M). Assigned to 341, 342, 343 Interceptor Squadrons (Μοίρες Αναχαιτίσεως) and retired in 1965.

 Honduran Air Force Received 10 Ex-Yugoslav Air Force Sabres in 1976.

 Italian Air Force operated 179 former Royal Air Force Canadair CL-13 Sabre Mk.4 supplied by the Mutual Defense Aid Program, redesignated F-86E(M) from 1956 until 1976

 Pakistan Air Force - Operated 90  Ex-Luftwaffe CL-13B Mk.6s from 1966 to 1980 which were obtained via Iran.
 No. 14 Squadron "Tail Choppers"
 No. 17 Squadron "Tigers"
No. 18 Squadron
No. 19 Squadron "Warhawks"

 South African Air Force

 Turkish Air Force acquired ex-RCAF 107 Canadair CL-13 Sabre Mk.2 “F-86E(M)„ in 1954, retired 1968.

 Royal Air Force - Acquired three Canadair CL-13 Mark 2s and 428 Mark 4s, 8 December 1952 – 19 December 1953. During 1956–1958, 302 RAF Sabres were overhauled/modified in the UK and returned to the US Government (who, with the Canadians, had financed the aircraft for the Mutual Defense Aid Program) in camouflage colours with Canadian serials and redesignated as F-86E(M); of which 121 were then sent to Yugoslavia and 179 to Italy.
3 Squadron 1953–1956 at RAF Wildenrath then RAF Geilenkirchen
4 Squadron 1954–1955 at RAF Jever
20 Squadron 1953–1955 at RAF Oldenburg
26 Squadron 1953–1955 at RAF Oldenburg
66 Squadron 1954–1956 at RAF Linton-on-Ouse
67 Squadron 1953–1956 at RAF Wildenrath then RAF Bruggen
71 Squadron 1953–1956 at RAF Wildenrath then RAF Bruggen
92 Squadron 1954–1956 at RAF Linton-on-Ouse
93 Squadron 1954–1956 at RAF Jever
112 Squadron 1954–1956 at RAF Bruggen
130 Squadron 1953–1956 at RAF Bruggen
234 Squadron 1953–1956 at RAF Oldenburg then RAF Geilenkirchen

 United States Air Force

 JRV Yugoslav Air Force Received 46 former RAF Canadair CL-13 Mk.IV in 1956/57 through Mutual Defense Aid Program, and bought another 78 ex-RAF machines from MDAP in 1959, for a total of 121 Sabres, redesignated as F-86E(M).

Survivors

Specifications (Sabre Mk.6)

See also

References

Notes

Bibliography

 Childerhose, R.J. The F-86 Sabre. New York: Arco Publishing, 1965.
 Dempsey, Daniel V. A Tradition of Excellence: Canada's Airshow Team Heritage. Victoria: High Flight Enterprises Ltd., 2002. .
 Flypast Magazine, August 2007, Key Publishing Ltd.
 Joos, Gerhard W. Canadair Sabre Mk 1-6, Commonwealth Sabre Mk 30-32 in RCAF, RAF, RAAF, SAAF, Luftwaffe & Foreign Service. Kent, UK: Osprey Publications Limited, 1971. .
 Robinson, Robbie. NATO F-86D/K Sabre Dogs. Le Havre, Editions Minimonde76, 120 p. 2018, .
 Milberry, Larry. The Canadair Sabre. Toronto: CANAV Books, 1986. .
 Pickler, Ron and Larry Milberry. Canadair: the First 50 Years. Toronto: CANAV Books, 1995. .
 Wagner, Ray. The North American Sabre. London: Macdonald & Co (Publishers) Ltd, 1963.

External links

 Warbird Alley: F-86 Sabre page - Information about F-86s still flying today
 Sabre site
 Canadair Sabres in J.Baugher site

Sabre
1950s Canadian fighter aircraft
Single-engined jet aircraft
Low-wing aircraft
F-86 Sabre
Aircraft first flown in 1950
Canada–United States military relations